Acrobasis mniaropis is a species of snout moth in the genus Acrobasis. It was described by Turner in 1904, and is known from Australia.

References

Moths described in 1904
Acrobasis
Moths of Australia